Wet may refer to:
 Moisture, the condition of containing liquid or being covered or saturated in liquid
 Wetting (or wetness), a measure of how well a liquid sticks to a solid rather than forming a sphere on the surface

Wet or WET may also refer to:

Arts and entertainment

Games
 Wet (video game), a 2009 video game
 Wolfenstein: Enemy Territory, a 2003 video game
 Lula: The Sexy Empire, also titled Wet: The Sexy Empire, a 1998 computer game

Music
 Wet (band), an American indie pop group
 Wet (album), by Barbra Streisand
 "Wet" (Nicole Scherzinger song), a song from the album Killer Love (2011)
 "Wet" (Snoop Dogg song), the lead single from the album Doggumentary
 "Wet" (YFN Lucci song), the lead single from the mixtape Wish Me Well 3

Other media
 Wet (magazine), a magazine about "gourmet bathing" in the late 1970s

Businesses
 WET (company), a water feature design firm
 Wet Lubricants, a brand of personal lubricants

Economics 
 Wine equalisation tax (WET), a tax for wine in Australia

Places
 Wet Mountains, in southern Colorado
 Wet Moor, an ecosystem in Somerset, UK
 Wet Lake (Kuyavia-Pomerania Voivodeship), Poland
 Wet Lake (Warmia-Masuria Voivodeship), Poland
 Wet Hollow

Transport
 Weeton railway station, North Yorkshire, England, National Rail station code

In science and technology
 "Wet", in audio signal processing, a descriptor of audio processed with reverb and delay
 WET,  an acronym for "Write Everything Twice" which can be opposed to DRY (Don't repeat yourself)
 WET Web Tester, an automated web testing tool
 Weightless environmental testing, or simulated weightlessness, often achieved via neutral buoyancy simulation
 Whole Earth Telescope, a network of telescopes for performing round the clock astronomical observations
 Whole effluent toxicity, a measure used by the US Environmental Protection Agency
 Phencyclidine (PCP), a dissociative anesthetic

Other uses
 Wets, members of the British Conservative Party who opposed some of Prime Minister Margaret Thatcher's policies
 Wets, opponents of prohibition in the United States
 Wet market, a type of marketplace specializing in fresh meat, fish, and produce
 Wat (food), a stew in Ethiopian and Eritrean cuisine
 Western European Time, UTC+00:00, the time zone of Iceland, Ireland, Portugal, the UK and other countries
 Wetarese language (ISO 639 code), spoken on the island of Wetar, Indonesia
 Wuest Expanded Translation, a 1961 translation of the New Testament by Kenneth Wuest

See also
 Wet dream
 Bedwetting
 Urinary incontinence
 De Wet (disambiguation)